The Chaos Communication Congress is an annual conference organized by the Chaos Computer Club. The congress features a variety of lectures and workshops on technical and political issues related to security, cryptography, privacy and online freedom of speech. It has taken place regularly at the end of the year since 1984, with the current date and duration (27–30 December) established in 2005. It is considered one of the largest events of its kind, alongside DEF CON in Las Vegas.

History
The congress is held in Germany. It started in 1984 in Hamburg, moved to Berlin in 1998, and back to Hamburg in 2012, having exceeded the capacity of the Berlin venue with more than  attendees. Since 2017 it has taken place at the Trade Fair Grounds in Leipzig, since the Hamburg venue was closed for renovation in 2017 and the existing space was not enough for the growing congress.

A large range of speakers are featured. The event is organized by volunteers called Chaos Angels. The non-members entry fee for four days was €100 in 2016, and was raised to €120 in 2018 to include a public transport ticket for the Leipzig area.

An important part of the congress are the assemblies, semi-open spaces with clusters of tables and internet connections for groups and individuals to collaborate and socialize in projects, workshops and hands-on talks. These assembly spaces, introduced at the 2012 meeting, combine the hack center project space and distributed group spaces of former years.

From 1997 to 2004 the congress also hosted the annual German Lockpicking Championships. 2005 was the first year the Congress lasted four days instead of three and lacked the German Lockpicking Championships.

2020 was the first year where the Congress did not take place at a physical location due to the COVID-19 pandemic, giving way to the first Remote Chaos Experience (rC3).

The Chaos Computer Club announced to return to the now newly renovated Congress Center Hamburg for the 37th edition of the Chaos Communication Congress. The announcement confirms the usual date of 27-30 December, notably omitting the year it will be held. On 18 October 2022, they confirmed that the congress will indeed not be held in 2022.

Congresses from 1984 to today

Gallery

See also 
 Chaos Communication Camp
 SIGINT
 DEF CON

Notes

References

External links

 Overview of Chaos Communication Congresses
 Blog for the Chaos Communication Congress (and other events)

Cryptography
Freedom of speech
Free-software events
Hacker conventions
Privacy
Recurring events established in 1984
Security
1984 establishments in Germany
Culture in Berlin
20th century in Hamburg
21st century in Hamburg
Information technology in Germany